, also known as , was the 35th and 37th monarch of Japan, according to the traditional order of succession.

Kōgyoku's reign spanned the years from 642 to 645. Her reign as Saimei encompassed 655 to 661. In other words, 
 642: She ascended the throne as Kōgyoku-tennō, and she stepped down in response to the assassination of Soga no Iruka (see: Isshi incident).
 645: She abdicated in favor of her brother, who would become known as Emperor Kōtoku.
 654: Kōtoku died and the throne was vacant.
 655: She re-ascended, beginning a new reign as Saimei-tennō.
 661: Saimei ruled until her death caused the throne to be vacant again.
The two reigns of this one woman spanned the years from 642 through 661.

In the history of Japan, Kōgyoku/Saimei was the second of eight women to take on the role of empress regnant.  The sole female monarch before Kōgyoku/Saimei was Suiko-tennō. The six female sovereigns reigning after Kōgyoku/Saimei were Jitō, Genmei, Genshō, Kōken/Shōtoku, Meishō, and Go-Sakuramachi.

Traditional narrative
As empress, her name would have been .

Princess Takara (Takara no miko) was a great-granddaughter of Emperor Bidatsu.

Events in Kōgyoku's reign
During her first reign the Soga clan seized power. Her son Naka no Ōe planned a coup d'état and slew Soga no Iruka at the court in front of her throne.  The Empress, shocked by this incident, abdicated the throne.

Kōgyoku's contemporary title would not have been tennō, as most historians believe this title was not introduced until the reigns of Emperor Tenmu and Empress Jitō. Rather, it was presumably Sumeramikoto or Amenoshita Shiroshimesu Ōkimi (治天下大王), meaning "the Great Queen who rules all under Heaven".  Alternatively, Kōgyoku might have been referred to as (ヤマト大王/大君) or the "Great Queen of Yamato".

Empress Kōgyoku reigned for four years. The years of Kōgyoku's reign are not linked by scholars to any era or nengō.  The Taika era innovation of naming time periods – nengō – was yet to be initiated during her son's too-brief reign.

In this context, Brown and Ishida's translation of Gukanshō offers an explanation about the years of Empress Jitō's reign which muddies a sense of easy clarity in the pre-Taiho time-frame: 
"The eras that fell in this reign were: (1) the remaining seven years of Shuchō [(686+7=692?)]; and (2) Taika, which was four years long [695–698]. (The first year of this era was kinoto-hitsuji [695].) ... In the third year of the Taka era [697], Empress Jitō yielded the throne to the Crown Prince."

The years of Kōgyoku's reign are not more specifically identified by more than one era name or nengō which was an innovation of Kōtoku's brief reign.

Events in Saimei's reign
When Kōtoku died, his designated heir was Naka no Ōe.  When Naka no Ōe's mother re-ascended, he continued in the role of her heir and crown prince. In this role, he could and did remain active in the political life of Japan.

In the fifth year of Saimei's reign, Paekche in Korea was destroyed in 660. Japan assisted Paekche loyals in an attempt to aid the revival of Paekche dynasty. Early in 661, Saimei responded to the situation by leaving her capital in Yamato Province. Her plan was to lead a military expedition to Korea. The empress stayed in Ishiyu Temporary Palace in Iyo Province, today Dōgo Onsen. In May she arrived at Asakura Palace in the north part of Tsukushi province in Kyūshū, today a part of Fukuoka Prefecture. The allied army of Japan and Baekje was preparing for war against Silla, but the death of the empress thwarted those plans.  In 661, Saimei died in the Asakura Palace before the army departed to Korea. In October her body was brought from Kyūshū by sea to Port Naniwa-zu (today Osaka city); and her state funeral was held in early November.

Empress Saimei ruled for seven years.  The years of Saimei's reign are not linked by scholars to any era or nengō.  The Taika era innovation of naming time periods – nengō – languished until Mommu reasserted an imperial right by proclaiming the commencement of Taihō in 701.

The actual site of Kōgyoku/Saimei's grave is known, having been identified as the Kengoshizuka tomb in the village of Asuka, Nara Prefecture. This empress is traditionally venerated at a memorial Shinto shrine (misasagi) at Nara.

The Imperial Household Agency designates this location as Kōgyoku/Seimei's mausoleum.  It is formally named Ochi-no-Okanoe no misasagi.

Kugyō
Kugyō (公卿) is a collective term for the very few most powerful men attached to the court of the Emperor of Japan in pre-Meiji eras.

In general, this elite group included only three to four men at a time.  These were hereditary courtiers whose experience and background would have brought them to the pinnacle of a life's career.  During Kōgyoku's reign, this apex of the  Daijō-kan included:
 Sadaijin
 Udaijin

The kugyō during Saimei's reign included:
 Sadaijin, Kose no Tokoda(巨勢徳太) (593–658), 649–658  
 Udaijin (not appointed)
 Naidaijin (内臣), Nakatomi no Kamako(中臣鎌子) (Fujiwara no Kamatari, 藤原鎌足) (614–669), 645–669

Spouses and children
Empress Sanmei, born Princess Takara, was the daughter of Prince Chinu, a grandson of Emperor Bidatsu, and his princess consort.

Firstly, she married Prince Takamuku and had a son.Secondly, the princess married Prince Toneri who also was Emperor Bidatsu's grandson.The marriage produce one daughter and two sons who both ascended the throne in the future.
 First Husband: Prince Takamuku (高向王), Prince Tame's son (also Emperor Yomei’s grandson)
 First Son: Prince Kara (漢皇子)
 Second Husband: Prince Tamura (田村皇子) later Emperor Jomei, Prince Oshisaka-no-hikohito-no-Ōe's son (also Emperor Bidatsu’s grandson)
 Second Son: Prince Naka no Ōe (中大兄皇子) later Emperor Tenji)
 First Daughter: Princess Hashihito  (間人皇女, d. 665), married Emperor Kōtoku
 Third Son: Prince Ōama(大海人皇子) later Emperor Tenmu

Popular culture
 Portrayed by Kim Min-kyung in the 2012-2013 KBS1 TV series Dream of the Emperor.

Ancestry

See also
 Empress of Japan
 Emperor of Japan
 List of emperors of Japan
 Imperial cult

Notes

References
 Aston, William George. (1896).  Nihongi: Chronicles of Japan from the Earliest Times to A.D. 697. London: Kegan Paul, Trench, Trubner. 
 Brown, Delmer M. and Ichirō Ishida, eds. (1979).  Gukanshō: The Future and the Past. Berkeley: University of California Press. ; 
 Ponsonby-Fane, Richard Arthur Brabazon. (1959).  The Imperial House of Japan. Kyoto: Ponsonby Memorial Society. 
 Titsingh, Isaac. (1834). Nihon Ōdai Ichiran; ou,  Annales des empereurs du Japon.  Paris: Royal Asiatic Society, Oriental Translation Fund of Great Britain and Ireland. 
 Varley, H. Paul. (1980). Jinnō Shōtōki: A Chronicle of Gods and Sovereigns. New York: Columbia University Press. ; 

 
 

 
 

 Women rulers in Japan
Japanese retired emperors
594 births
661 deaths
Japanese empresses regnant
People of Asuka-period Japan
7th-century monarchs in Asia
7th-century women rulers
6th-century Japanese people
7th-century Japanese monarchs
7th-century Japanese women
7th-century Japanese poets
6th-century Japanese women
6th-century Japanese poets